The seven suburbicarian dioceses are Roman Catholic dioceses located in the vicinity of Rome, whose (titular) bishops are the (now six) ordinary members of the highest-ranking order of cardinals, the cardinal bishops (to which the cardinal-patriarchs were added). Pope Francis has, in addition, co-opted five cardinals of the Latin Church to join the ranks of the Cardinal-Bishops.

Seven suburbicarian sees 
The suburbicarian dioceses have varied slightly over time and nowadays consist of:
 the Diocese of Ostia (since 1150 the additional see of the Dean of the College of Cardinals)
 the Diocese of Velletri-Segni
 the Diocese of Porto-Santa Rufina
 the Diocese of Frascati (Tusculum)
 the Diocese of Palestrina
 the Diocese of Albano
 the Diocese of Sabina-Poggio Mirteto

The see of Ostia is conferred on the Dean of the College of Cardinals in addition to the see he already had. (Until 1914, the dean received the see of Ostia and Velletri in place of the see he had earlier. The sees of Ostia and Velletri were separated in 1914.) The cardinal-dean used to be the longest-serving cardinal bishop, but is now chosen by the six cardinal bishops with the approval of the Pope.

Incumbents

Diocesan administration 
The increasing involvement of the cardinal bishops in the administration of the papal curia resulted in a detachment from their dioceses. Therefore, some of them, in particular the cardinal-bishops of Sabina and Velletri, have for centuries had auxiliary bishops and in 1910 Pope Pius X's apostolic constitution Apostolicae Romanorum made this practice obligatory for all suburbicarian dioceses.
 
In 1962, Pope John XXIII in his decree Suburbicarii sedis made the cardinal bishops into titular bishops and made provision for the appointment of separate residential diocesan bishops for Velletri-Segni, Porto-Santa-Rufina, Frascati, Palestrina, Albano and Sabina. For the diocese of Ostia — the titular diocese of the Dean of the College of Cardinals — no resident diocesan bishop was appointed; it is entrusted to an apostolic administrator, which is always the Cardinal Vicar of Rome. Though the diocesan bishops exercise all episcopal administrative functions, the cardinal bishops still formally take possession of their titular dioceses.

See also 
 Diocese of Rome#Suburbicarian sees
 Titular church

References 

 

Titular sees